Zodarion rubidum is a spider species of the family Zodariidae.

Like most Zodariidae, Z. rubidum is an ant-eating spider. It resembles ants structurally and behaviorally. Z. rubidum specifically mimics red ants, such as Myrmica sabuleti. It often feeds on Tetramorium caespitum or Lasius platythorax.

Zodarion rubidum is up to 5mm in size. Like many other zodariid spiders, it moves across open ground in the evening and at night.

Distribution
Zodarion rubidum originally occurred in southwestern France, but has spread during the last few decades into central Europe, and has been introduced to U.S. and Canada.

References
 Pekar, S. & Kral, J. (2002) Mimicry complex in two central European zodariid spiders (Araneae: Zodariidae): how Zodarion deceives ants. Biological Journal of the Linnean Society 75:517–532. Abstract

rubidum
Spiders of Europe
Spiders of North America
Spiders described in 1914